Vikki Elizabeth Thorn (née Simpson, born c. 1974) is an Australian harmonica player, guitarist, vocalist, and songwriter and one-third of the Australian folk rock band the Waifs. Her elder sister, Donna Simpson, also plays guitar and sings in the group. Vikki has released eight studio albums with the Waifs, and wrote the band's singles, "Bridal Train" (2004) and "Sun Dirt Water" (2007).

Since 2021, Thorn has released music under the name Thornbird.

Early life and education 
Thorn and her elder sister, Donna, grew up in Albany, Western Australia. Their father, Jimmy Simpson, fished salmon in season. In an interview with Andrew Denton on Enough Rope, Thorn described the lifestyle of a fisherman's daughter:

Career

1980s-1991: Early life
Thorn received a harmonica when she was a teenager, and started playing Bob Dylan songs. She harmonised Everly Brothers songs with her sister, who played guitar. They formed a blues covers duo, Colours, in Albany. On Thorn's last day of high school, aged 16, she was picked up by Simpson, in a yellow Kombi, who asked her to travel with her:

1992-2018: The Waifs

Thorn and Simpson met Josh Cunningham in August 1992 in Broome, the sisters had been travelling across greater Western Australia, playing the blues in rural bars based on what a town's tourist bureau described as the music scene for that area. After less than an hour conversation with Cunningham, Simpson asked him to join them in Colours as a trio. Upon return to Albany their "grandmother said 'Oh here come the waifs'" and they decided to rename their trio as the Waifs.

The Waifs toured Western Australia from 1993 to 1996. In 1996 they moved to the east coast and made the group a serious music career. In May 1996, their self-titled debut was released, three months after it was recorded. It featured three songs from Thorn: "Circles", "I Believe", and "Company". After touring more throughout the mid-nineties, the band released Shelter Me in 1998, and Sink or Swim in 2000. Sink or Swim was released, and more touring commenced. The Waifs were now becoming an international concern, and popularity increased when Up All Night was released. Shortly after its release, the album was certified 2× platinum in Australia and two successful singles followed: "London Still" and "Lighthouse", written by Simpson and Cunningham, respectively.

At the 2004 Boxing Day tsunami relief concert, WaveAid, in January 2005 the Waifs performed with Thorn providing harmonica. Thorn's song "Bridal Train" was released as a single, by the group in 2004, and the song won the USA Songwriting Competition in 2006. The Waifs' fifth studio album, Sun, Dirt, Water (September 2007), provided a title single, which was written by Thorn.

During 2014 Thorn and Simpson undertook a side project, Stray Sisters, with Ben Franz on pedal steel and lap steel guitars (also an auxiliary bass guitarist of the Waifs). Thorn recalled "That was a real different experience for me because usually I play a minimum amount of guitar in the Waifs but when I was in the Stray Sisters I had to play more rhythm, supporting rhythm parts to what Donna was doing. So that was the good thing about it. That challenged me a little bit and I got to play electric guitar."

The group's eighth studio album, Ironbark, released in February 2017, led Thorn to reflect on their being together for 25 years, "I just sent an email the other day saying 'When the tour's over, when do we celebrate?' We need to have a party, we need to have something where we sit down and celebrate, just have a toast."

2020: Vikki Thorn and the Red Tails
Thorn returned home to Western Australia after ten years in Utah, USA and in 2020, Thorn formed an Albany-based trio, Vikki Thorn and the Red Tails, with Simon and Tammy London and started performing solo material around Western Australia.

2021-present: Thornbird
In July 2021, Thorn released her first material as Thornbird. The single, "Tempest" is a cinematic tale of hope and desire, told by a lonely waitress stuck in a predictable, suffocating, desolate, outback truck stop.

IN March 2022, Thornbird release her debut studio album, which debuted at number 5 on the Australian Independent Label chart.

Personal life

Vikki Thorn and bandmate, Josh Cunningham, had a romantic relationship for 12 years, which according to Thorn "broke down". She also said that "Through all those years of touring, there was that dynamic going on."

Thorn wrote the Waifs song, "Sun Dirt Water" (August 2007), for her husband, Matt Thorn, "I wrote the song as a letter to him, just letting him know the things that were important to me and describing the road we were going to travel... It's the last song I wrote, and I wrote it four years ago." The couple have three children and since 2008 reside in Utah.

Discography

Studio albums

Awards and nominations

ARIA Music Awards
The ARIA Music Awards is an annual awards ceremony that recognises excellence, innovation, and achievement across all genres of Australian music. They commenced in 1987. 

! 
|-
| 2022
| Thornbird (as Thornbird)
| ARIA Award for Best Blues and Roots Album
| 
| 
|-

References

Musicians from Western Australia
Australian women guitarists
Living people
Year of birth missing (living people)
Place of birth missing (living people)
Australian harmonica players